Lunchtime with Wogan was a British television series hosted by Terry Wogan which aired from 1972 to 1973 on ITV. It was produced by Associated Television and formed part of ITV's newly launched afternoon schedule, transmitting live between 13:00 and 13:30 on Tuesdays from 17 October 1972. All 44 episodes are missing, believed lost, with only a "Christmas with the Stars" segment remaining which as now been released on all star comedy carnival dvd by network dvd

References

External links
Lunchtime with Wogan on IMDb

1972 British television series debuts
1973 British television series endings
Lost television shows
English-language television shows
1970s British television series